Set out below is a list of former and current commercial operators of the Airbus A340 airliner.

Airline operators
There were 214 Airbus A340 aircraft in commercial service .

Orders and deliveries
The following is a list of orders and deliveries for the Airbus A340 by variant.

See also
 List of Airbus A330 operators

References

Airbus A340
Operators